Banned in New York is a live album by saxophonist Greg Osby recorded at Sweet Basil in New York City in 1997 for the Blue Note label. The album was recorded by Osby on a MiniDisc recorder placed on a table in front of the band.

Reception

The AllMusic review by Joel Roberts stated, "This is jazz in its purest form: spontaneous, direct, and unfiltered". The Penguin Guide to Jazz listed the album as part of its "Core Collection" recommended for jazz fans. All About Jazz called it "A quality effort, which receives high, marks for representing Osby’s terrific band as a serious 'live' act minus some of the normal fluff and cosmetics. Nice work guys! ...Recommended". Harvey Pekar, writing for JazzTimes, stated: "A skilled player, Osby's always thinking; even at the fastest tempos he seems in control, and resists the temptation to go on automatic pilot".

Track listing
 "13th Floor" (Osby) - 12:54  
 "Pent-Up House" (Sonny Rollins) - 13:24
 "I Didn't Know About You" (Duke Ellington, Bob Russell) - 11:45  
 "Big Foot" (Charlie Parker) - 14:10
 "Big Foot" [excerpt] (Parker) - 2:42   
 "52nd Street Theme" (Thelonious Monk) - 3:12

Personnel
Greg Osby - alto saxophone
Jason Moran - piano
Atsushi (Az'Shi) Osada - bass
Rodney Green - drums

References

1998 live albums
Greg Osby live albums
Blue Note Records live albums